Filatima sperryi is a moth of the family Gelechiidae. It is found in North America, where it has been recorded from California, Nevada and Utah.

The wingspan is 18–21 mm. The extreme costal edge, a narrow line around apex and termen and a broad, elongate area from the base of the wing to the tornus, are blackish fuscous, while the remainder of the wing is buckthorn brown. There is a small whitish spot on the costa and tornus. The hindwings are pale fuscous basally shading to fuscous apically.

Etymology
The species is named for John L. Sperry, who provided the type specimen and the Nevada specimen.

References

Moths described in 1947
Filatima